Sunnybank, also known as The Inn at Hot Springs, is a historic home located at Hot Springs, Madison County, North Carolina.  It was built about 1875, and is a two-story, rambling Italianate style frame building.  It has a complex roof system of intersecting gables with deep eaves and large curvilinear sawn brackets.  It was built as a private summer home, then opened as a boardinghouse in 1912.

It was listed on the National Register of Historic Places in 1980.

Gallery

References

Houses on the National Register of Historic Places in North Carolina
Italianate architecture in North Carolina
Houses completed in 1875
Houses in Madison County, North Carolina
National Register of Historic Places in Madison County, North Carolina